Kiełczów  is a village in the administrative district of Gmina Długołęka, within Wrocław County, Lower Silesian Voivodeship, in south-western Poland. Prior to 1945 it was part of Germany, Bohemian Crown, Austria and Kingdom of Poland.

It is part of the Wrocław metropolitan area.

References

Villages in Wrocław County